Treasure of the Moon Goddess is a 1987 Mexican-American adventure film directed by Joseph Louis Agraz, starring Asher Brauner, Don Calfa, Linnea Quigley and Jo Ann Ayres. The plot concerns a pop singer who is kidnapped by pirates while touring Central America because of her resemblance to a native moon goddess.

Cast
Asher Brauner as Sam Kidd
Don Calfa as Harold Grand
Linnea Quigley as Lu De Belle
Jo-Ann Ayer as Brandy
Danny Addis as Diaz
Danny Addis as Imal
Rene Pereyra as Carlos
Enrique Lucero as Tupac
Ramon Barragan as Louis
Eric Weston as Treasure Thief
Antonio Sanchez as Diaz Thug

External links
 

1987 films
1980s adventure drama films
American adventure drama films
1980s English-language films
English-language Mexican films
1980s Spanish-language films
Mexican adventure drama films
1987 drama films
1987 multilingual films
American multilingual films
Mexican multilingual films
1980s American films
1980s Mexican films